Dicepolia cuiabalis is a moth in the family Crambidae. It was described by James E. Hayden in 2009. It is found in Brazil, where it has been recorded from Mato Grosso.

The length of the forewings is about 9.1 mm. The forewings are yellowish brown, but darker orange brown at the costa. The transverse lines consist of blackish scales. The hindwings are pearly white with yellowish or rosy brown terminal area. Adults have been recorded on wing in late September.

Etymology
The species name refers to Cuiabá, the city which is nearest to the type locality.

References

Moths described in 2009
Odontiinae